The 1988 NCAA Division I Outdoor Track and Field Championships were contested June 1−4, 1988 at Hayward Field at the University of Oregon in Eugene, Oregon in order to determine the individual and team national champions of men's and women's collegiate Division I outdoor track and field events in the United States.

These were the 66th annual men's championships and the seventh annual women's championships. This was the Ducks' sixth time hosting the event and the first since 1984.

In a repeat of the previous year's result, UCLA and LSU topped the men's and women's team standings, respectively; it was the Bruins' eighth men's team title and the second for the Lady Tigers. LSU's title would ultimately be the second of a record eleven consecutive national championships between 1987 and 1997.

Team results 
 Note: Top 10 only
 (H) = Hosts
 Full results

Men's standings

Women's standings

Individual results

References

NCAA Men's Outdoor Track and Field Championship
NCAA Division I Outdoor Track and Field Championships
NCAA
NCAA Division I Outdoor Track and Field Championships
NCAA Women's Outdoor Track and Field Championship